Lone Mountain is an unincorporated community in Claiborne County, Tennessee, United States. Its ZIP code is 37773.

Notes

Unincorporated communities in Claiborne County, Tennessee
Unincorporated communities in Tennessee